The 2023 French F4 Championship will be the 13th season to run under the guise of the French F4 Championship and the sixth under the FIA Formula 4 regulations. The series will begin on 7 April at Circuit Paul Armagnac and will end on 8 October at Circuit Paul Ricard. It will be the first season in which the series is partnered with the ADAC Formel Junior Team.

Driver lineup

Race calendar 
French Federation of Automobile Sport published the schedule on 25 November 2022. In January 2023, the round at the Circuit de Lédenon was postponed by two weeks.

Notes

References

External links 
Official website of the FFSA Academy

F4
French F4
French F4
French F4